John Hay, 2nd Marquess of Tweeddale PC (1645 – 20 April 1713) was a Scottish nobleman.

Early life
Hay was the eldest son of John Hay, 1st Marquess of Tweeddale and his wife, Lady Jean Scott, daughter of Walter Scott, 1st Earl of Buccleuch. His younger brothers were Lord David Hay of Belton (who married Rachel Hayes, daughter of Sir James Hayes), Lord Alexander Hay of Spott (who married Catherine Charters, daughter of Laurence Charters), Lady Margaret Hay (wife of Robert Ker, 3rd Earl of Roxburghe), and Lady Jean Hay (wife of William Douglas, 1st Earl of March).

His paternal grandparents were John Hay, 1st Earl of Tweeddale and, his first wife, Lady Jean Seton (only daughter by his second wife of Alexander Seton, 1st Earl of Dunfermline). His maternal grandparents were Walter Scott, 1st Earl of Buccleuch and Lady Mary Hay (third daughter of Francis Hay, 9th Earl of Erroll).

Career
He was Colonel of the Militia Regiment of Foot in Co Haddington (1668–1674) and Linlithgow and Peebles (1682). He was Burgess of Edinburgh (1668), Commissioner for the Borders (1672–1684), Commissioner of Supply for Haddington (1678, 1685, 1690, 1704), Peebles (1678, 1685), Edinburgh (1690, 1704), Fife (1695, 1704), Berwick (1704); Colonel of the East Lothian Regiment (1685), Captain of the Militia Horse for Haddington and Berwick (1689), Privy Councillor of Scotland (1689), Sheriff of Haddington from 1694 to 1713, and Commissioner of the Admiralty (Scotland) (1695). He was also Lord Treasurer in 1695. He succeeded his father in the marquessate in 1697.

He was appointed Lord High Commissioner to the Scots Parliament in 1704, and was Lord Chancellor of Scotland from 1704 to 1705. He led the Squadrone Volante, but ultimately supported the Union. He was appointed one of 18 Scottish representative peers in 1707.

He had been elected a Fellow of the Royal Society in 1666 but was expelled in 1685.

Personal life
In 1666, he married Lady Mary Maitland at Highgate in London. Lady Mary was a daughter of John Maitland, 1st Duke of Lauderdale and the former Anne Home. However, Lauderdale set himself against Hay, who was forced to leave for the continent and did not regain his position until Lauderdale's death in 1682. Together, they were the parents of:

 Charles Hay, 3rd Marquess of Tweeddale (–1715), who married Lady Susan Cochrane, the widow of John Cochrane, 2nd Earl of Dundonald who was the second daughter of William Douglas-Hamilton, Duke of Hamilton, and Anne Hamilton, suo jure Duchess of Hamilton (eldest daughter and co-heiress of James Hamilton, 1st Duke of Hamilton).
 Lord John Hay (d. 1706), who commanded the famous regiment of dragoons, afterwards called the Scots Greys, at the Battle of Ramillies; he married Lady Elizabeth Dalzell, only child of James Dalzell, 3rd Earl of Carnwath, and, after her death, Elizabeth Orby, a daughter of Sir Thomas Orby, Bt.
 Lord William Hay (d. 1723) of Newhall, a Brig.-Gen. who married his cousin Margaret Hay, only child of John Hay (eldest son and heir apparent of Sir James Hay, 1st Baronet of Linplum) and Jean Foulis (daughter of Sir John Foulis, 1st Baronet of Ravelstoun).
 Lady Anne Hay, who married, as his third wife, William Ross, 12th Lord Ross.
 Lady Jean Hay (d. 1731), who married John Hamilton-Leslie, 9th Earl of Rothes, in 1697.

Lord Tweeddale died on 20 April 1713. He was succeeded in his titles by his eldest son, Charles.

References

External links

1645 births
1713 deaths
Scottish representative peers
Lords High Commissioner to the Parliament of Scotland
Fellows of the Royal Society
Members of the Parliament of Scotland 1689–1702
Members of the Parliament of Scotland 1702–1707
Commissioners of the Treasury of Scotland
Tweeddale
2